The Basic Income Earth Network (BIEN; until 2004 Basic Income European Network) is a network of academics and activists interested in the idea of basic income. It serves as a link between individuals and groups committed to or interested in basic income, and fosters informed discussion on this topic throughout the world. BIEN's website defines a basic income as "a periodic cash payment unconditionally delivered to all on an individual basis, without means-test or work requirement."

History
Formed in 1986, BIEN held its first international conference in Louvain-la-Neuve in September of that year. It expanded its scope from Europe to the Earth in 2004. From 1988 BIEN published a paper newsletter three times per year; later replaced by an electronic NewsFlash , distributed first six and now twelve times per year. Since 2011, BIEN has sponsored a news website, called Basic Income News.

The main founders of BIEN are Yoland Bresson, Philippe Van Parijs, Karl Widerquist, Alexander de Roo, Guy Standing and David Casassas .

Every two years until 2014, and ever year since 2016, BIEN has organised an international congress gathering academics and activists for basic income. The 2016 Congress took place in Seoul, South Korea; the 2017 Congress in Lisbon, Portugal; The 2018 congress took place in Tampere, Finland; The 2019 BIEN congress takes place at Hyderabad, India. For a full list of congresses, see BIEN's website. Papers given at the congresses can also be found on the organisation's website.

BIEN recognises a number of national and regional affiliated networks across the world.

BIEN's secretaries have been Walter Van Trier (1986–1994), Philippe Van Parijs (1994–2004), David Casassas (2004–2014), Anja Askeland (2014–2016), and Julio Aguirre (2016–). In May 2016, BIEN appointed Malcolm Torry as its General Manager.

Chairing of BIEN was a flexible matter during the early years: Those chairing were Peter Ashby, Claus Offe, Guy Standing (1986–88), Edwin Morley-Fletcher, Guy Standing (1988–1996), Edwin Morley-Fletcher, Ilona Ostner, Guy Standing (1996–1998), Ilona Ostner, Guy Standing (1998–2004). In 2004, a revision of the previously sketchy statutes established that there would be either a Chair and Vice chair, or two Co-chairs. Following 2004, posts were held as follows: Guy Standing, Eduardo Suplicy (co-chairs 2004–2008), Ingrid Van Niekerk and Karl Widerquist (co-chairs 2008–2014), Louise Haagh and Karl Widerquist (co-chairs 2014–2018). The new constitution of 2018 provided for a Chair and a Vice Chair: Postholders as follows: Louise Haagh (Chair, 2018–), Sarath Davala (Vice Chair, 2018–).

See also
Basic income
Basic income around the world
Citizen's dividend

References

External links

 
 Basic Income Studies: An International Journal of Basic Income Research

Universal basic income
International economic organizations
Organizations established in 1986
1986 establishments in Belgium